The Tana Bridge is a bridge that crosses the Tana River in Troms og Finnmark, Norway. It is located in a village also called Tana bru. 

The bridge was opened for traffic on 15 September 2020. It is a 260 meter long cable-stayed bridge with a main span of 234 meters.
It is the only bridge over the lowest 100 km of the Tana River. One nickname ('new bridge') "Nybrua", was in use in 2020 when the village once had two bridges.

Previously, there have been other bridges named Tana Bridge; one bridge was demolished, from late 2020 and into 2021. Previously, one bridge was demolished in 1944.

The bridge glows in different colours of light at night with GVA color-changing luminaires.

The bridge that existed from 1948 to 2020

In December 2020, twelve metres (from the center) of the bridge, was removed permanently; the final demolishment of the bridge was done [in first half of] 2021.

The old bridge was 220 metres long, and the main span is 194 metres.
The old bridge was opened in 1948. There was a predecessor bridge that was destroyed on November 6, 1944 as a consequence of the Liberation of Finnmark during World War II.

See also
Sami Bridge

References

Related reading
Chris Mann (2012) British Policy and Strategy Towards Norway, 1941-45 (Palgrave Macmillan) 	

Road bridges in Troms og Finnmark
Bridges completed in 1948
Suspension bridges in Norway
1948 establishments in Norway
Tana, Norway